Mesogobius nonultimus, or the Caspian toad goby, is one of the species of gobiid fish endemic to the brackish-waters Caspian Sea (lake). It will grow up to a length of 17.4 cm.

It has been recorded from Turkmenistan, Daghestan, Azerbaijan and Iran, and is probably found throughout the lake, in the coastal zone down to 50 m depth. Its sister taxon in the Black Sea basin is Mesogobius batrachocephalus.

References

Mesogobius
Fish of the Caspian Sea
Fish of Russia
Fish of Asia
Fish described in 1936
Endemic fauna of the Caspian Sea